This is a list of investigational antidepressants, or antidepressants that are currently under development for clinical use in the treatment of mood disorders but are not yet approved. Chemical/generic names are listed first, with developmental code names, synonyms, and brand names in parentheses. All drugs listed are specifically under development for major depressive disorder (MDD) and/or treatment-resistant depression (TRD) unless noted otherwise. Other forms of depression may include bipolar depression and postpartum depression.

Glutamatergics

NMDA receptor modulators
 4-Chlorokynurenine (AV-101) – NMDA receptor glycine site antagonist
 Apimostinel (GATE-202, NRX-1074) – NMDA receptor modulator
 Arketamine (PCN-101, HR-071603) – unknown mechanism of action, indirect AMPA receptor activator
 
 Esketamine (Esketamine DPI, Falkieri, PG061) – non-competitive NMDA receptor antagonist – approved for TRD, specifically under development for bipolar depression and "depressive disorders" 
 Esmethadone (dextromethadone; REL-1017) – NMDA receptor antagonist open channel blocker
 Ketamine (PMI-100, PMI-150, R-107, SHX-001, SLS-002; TUR-002) – non-competitive NMDA receptor antagonist
 MIJ-821 – NMDA receptor subunit 2B (NR2B) negative allosteric modulator 
 Rislenemdaz (CERC-301, MK-0657) – NMDA receptor NR2B antagonist

AMPA receptor modulators
 TAK-653 (NBI-1065845) – AMPA receptor positive allosteric modulator

Monoaminergics

Monoamine reuptake inhibitors
 
 OPC-64005 – serotonin–norepinephrine–dopamine reuptake inhibitor (SNDRI) 
 PDC-1421 (BLI-1005) – norepinephrine reuptake inhibitor (NRI)
 Toludesvenlafaxine (ansofaxine; LY03005, LPM570065) – SNDRI

Monoamine reuptake inhibitors and receptor modulators
 Hypidone (YL-0919) – SRI, 5-HT1A receptor partial agonist, and 5-HT6 receptor agonist 
 
 TGBA01AD (FKB01MD) – serotonin reuptake inhibitor (SRI), 5-HT1A and 5-HT1D receptor agonist, and 5-HT2 receptor antagonist 
 Vortioxetine (Trintellix) – SRI, 5-HT1A receptor agonist, 5-HT1B receptor partial agonist, 5-HT1D, 5-HT3, and 5-HT7 receptor antagonist – approved for MDD, under development for bipolar depression

Monoamine releasing agents
 Lisdexamfetamine (Elvanse, LDX, NRP-104, S-877489, SHP-489, SPD-489, Tyvense, Venvanse, Vyvanse) – norepinephrine–dopamine releasing agent (NDRA) 
 Midomafetamine (MDMA; ecstasy) – serotonin–norepinephrine–dopamine releasing agent (SNDRA)

Monoamine receptor modulators
 Aramisulpride/esamisulpride (85:15 ratio) (SEP-4199) – 5-HT7 receptor antagonist (aramisulpride) and D2 and D3 receptor antagonist (esamisulpride) – specifically under development for the treatment of bipolar depression
 Gepirone (TGFK07AD; Travivo) – 5-HT1A receptor partial agonist 
 Pramipexole (CTC-501, CTC-413) – D2, D3, and D4 receptor agonist
 Psilocybin – 5-HT2A receptor agonist

Atypical antipsychotics
 Brilaroxazine (RP-5063, RP-5000) – AA – specifically under development for the treatment of MDD
 Cariprazine (Reagila, Vraylar) – AA – approved for bipolar depression, under development for MDD 
 Lumateperone (ITI-007) – AA – specifically under development for the treatment of MDD and bipolar depression
 Lurasidone (Latuda) – AA – specifically under development for the treatment of MDD 
 Pimavanserin (Nuplazid; ACP-103; BVF-048) – 5-HT2A receptor antagonist – specifically under development for the treatment of MDD

Others
 Ademetionine (SAMe; MSI-190, MSI-195, Strada) – cofactor in monoamine neurotransmitter biosynthesis – specifically under development in the United States and Europe for the adjunctive treatment of MDD

GABAergics and neurosteroids

GABAA receptor positive modulators
 Zuranolone (SAGE-217) – GABAA receptor positive allosteric modulator – specifically under development for the treatment of MDD and postpartum depression

Others
 3β-Methoxypregnenolone (MAP-4343) – selective microtubule-associated protein 2 (MAP2) stimulant
 Itruvone (PH-10) – vomeropherine (precise mechanism of action unknown/undisclosed)

Opioidergics

κ-Opioid receptor antagonists
 Aticaprant (JNJ-67953964, CERC-501, LY-2456302) – selective κ-opioid receptor antagonist
 BTRX-335140 (BTRX-140) – selective k-opioid receptor antagonist
 Buprenorphine/samidorphan (ALKS-5461) – κ-opioid receptor antagonist and μ-opioid receptor antagonist 
 CVL-354 – selective κ-opioid receptor antagonist

Nociceptin receptor antagonists
 BTRX-246040 (LY-2940094) – nociceptin receptor antagonist

Cholinergics

Muscarinic acetylcholine receptor modulators
 Scopolamine (DPI-386) – muscarinic acetylcholine receptor antagonist

Others
 OnabotulinumtoxinA (botulinum toxin A, Botox) – acetylcholine release inhibitor – specifically under development for the treatment of MDD in women as a local injection to paralyze facial muscles

Orexin receptor antagonists
 JNJ-61393215 (JNJ-3215; Orexin-1) – OX1 receptor antagonist
 Seltorexant (MIN-202, JNJ-42847922, JNJ-922) – OX2 receptor antagonist

Others
 BI-1358894 – TRPC4 and TRPC5 inhibitor 
 Crisdesalazine (AAD-2004) – MPGES-1 inhibitor 
 Erteberel – selective ERβ receptor agonist 
 JNJ-54175446 – P2RX7 purinoceptor antagonist
 NSI-189 – hippocampal neurotrophic agent (precise mechanism of action unknown) 
 NV-5138 – sestrin2 modulator and consequent mammalian target of rapamycin complex 1 (mTORC1) activator
 SNG-12 – undefined mechanism of action 
 TS-121 – vasopressin 1B receptor antagonist
 WIP-DF17 – undefined mechanism of action 
 XEN1101 - KCNQ2/3 channel opener

Mixed
 Tramadol (ETS6103; Viotra) – μ-opioid receptor agonist, serotonin–norepinephrine reuptake inhibitor (SNRI) and possible serotonin releasing agent (SRA), 5-HT2C receptor antagonist, and other actions

Combinations
 
 Carbidopa/oxitriptan (EVX-101) – serotonin precursor and aromatic L-amino acid decarboxylase inhibitor 
 Cycloserine/lurasidone (NRX-101; Cyclurad) – NMDA receptor glycine site partial agonist and AA combination – specifically under development for the treatment of bipolar depression
 Deudextromethorphan/quinidine (AVP-786, CTP-786) – σ1 receptor agonist, SRI, uncompetitive NMDA receptor antagonist, and other actions

Not under development
The following notable drugs are of investigational interest as potential antidepressants but are not formally under clinical development for approval at this time:

 Hydroxynorketamine ((2R,6R)-HNK) – metabolite of ketamine which may be involved in ketamine's antidepressant-like effects in mice
 Mesembrine is an alkaloid present in Sceletium tortuosum (kanna). It has been shown to act as a serotonin reuptake inhibitor.
 Minocycline – microglia inhibitor and other actions; a 2018 systematic review and meta-analysis reported that the overall antidepressant effect size of minocycline compared to placebo was -0.78 (95% CI: -0.4 to -1.33, P=0.005), indicative of a large and statistically significant antidepressant effect
 Nitrous oxide – NMDA receptor antagonist and other actions
 R13 – an orally active prodrug of tropoflavin with improved pharmacokinetics
 Tropoflavin (7,8-dihydroxyflavone; 7,8-DHF) – TrkB agonist

See also 
 List of antidepressants
 List of investigational drugs

References

Further reading

External links 
 AdisInsight - Springer

Antidepressants
Antidepressants, investigational
Experimental drugs
Mood stabilizers